Henry Philip Wynn (born 19 February 1945) is a British statistician who has been a President of the Royal Statistical Society.

He gained a Bachelor of Arts in mathematics from Oxford and a PhD in Mathematical Statistics from Imperial College, London. He was appointed a Lecturer and then Reader at Imperial College before moving to City University London in 1985 as Professor of Mathematical Statistics (and Dean of Mathematics from 1987 to 1995). At City he co-founded the Engineering Design Centre.

He moved again, in 1995, to the University of Warwick as founding Director of the Risk Initiative and Statistical Consultancy Unit. He is currently, from 2003, Professor of Statistics at the Department of Statistics, London School of Economics where he leads the Decision Support and Risk Group.

He was a founding president of the European Network for Business and Industrial Statistics (ENBIS) and a Co-Investigator on the Research Councils UK funded project Managing Uncertainty in Complex Models (MUCM). He is author of around 140 published papers and three books/monographs.

He holds the Guy Medal in Silver from the Royal Statistical Society and the George Box Medal from the European Network for Business and Industrial Statistics (ENBIS), is an Honorary Fellow of the Institute of Actuaries and a Fellow of the Institute of Mathematical Statistics.

He was the elected President of the Royal Statistical Society in 1977, the first president to be elected by a contested vote. From 1834 to 1978, RSS Presidents had always been nominated and returned unopposed.  In 1978 however there had been a lot of opposition when Council arranged for Sir Campbell Adamson to stand for Council, on the understanding that he would stand for and become president the following year. However, for the first time in living memory there was an election for Council, and Campbell Adamson came last out of a 25 candidates. (There were 25 candidates and 24 place on Council.) Despite this, Campbell Adamson was put up for president, and Wynn was nominated as an alternative candidate.  Although Wynn was relatively unknown at the time, he won the election and completed his presidency.

He has undertaken a wide range of research in theoretical and applied statistics, focusing principally on model building. Projects with a biological focus include work in dynamic modelling in biology (multi-strain models).

Publications
Monographs since 2000
 "Dynamical Search" (H.P.Wynn, L Pronzato and A Zhigljavsky), Chapman & Hall/CRC, 2000
 "Algebraic Statistics" (H.P.Wynn, E Riccomagno and G Pistone), Chapman and Hall/CRC, 2001.

Selected papers
 "The Sequential Generation of D-Optimum Experimental Designs" (Henry P. Wynn), The Annals of Mathematical Statistics (1970) jstor
 "Design and Analysis of Computer Experiments" (Jerome Sacks, William J. Welch, Toby J. Mitchell and Henry P. Wynn). Statistical Science (1989). jstor

References

External links
 Google scholar page
 Personal home page

Academics of City, University of London
Academics of Imperial College London
Academics of the London School of Economics
Academics of the University of Warwick
Alumni of Imperial College London
British statisticians
Fellows of the Institute of Mathematical Statistics
Presidents of the Royal Statistical Society
Living people
1945 births